Raphael ("God has healed") is an archangel first mentioned in the Book of Tobit and in 1 Enoch, both estimated to date from between the 3rd and 2nd century BCE. In later Jewish tradition, he became identified as one of the three heavenly visitors entertained by Abraham at the Oak of Mamre. He is not named in either the New Testament or the Quran, but later Christian tradition identified him with healing and as the angel who stirred waters in the Pool of Bethesda in John 5:2–4, and in Islam, where his name is Israfil, he is understood to be the unnamed angel of Quran 6:73, standing eternally with a trumpet to his lips, ready to announce the Day of Judgment. In Gnostic tradition, Raphael is represented on the Ophite Diagram.

Origins in post-exilic literature

In the Hebrew Bible, the word  literally means messenger; either human or supernatural in nature. When used in the latter sense it is translated as "angel". The original mal'akh lacked both individuality and hierarchy, but after the Babylonian exile they were graded into a Babylonian-style hierarchy and the word archangelos, archangel, first appears in the Greek text of 1 Enoch. At the same time the angels and archangels began to be given names, as attested in the Talmudic statement that "the names of the angels were brought by the Jews from Babylonia", attributed to Shimon ben Lakish or Rabbi Hanina respectively.

Raphael first appears in two works of this period, 1 Enoch, a collection of originally independent texts from the 3rd century BCE, and the Book of Tobit, from the early 2nd century BCE. In the oldest stratum of 1 Enoch (1 Enoch 9:1) he is one of the four named archangels, and in Tobit 12:11–15 he is one of seven.  

His name derives from the Hebrew root רפא (r-p-ʾ) meaning "to heal", and can be translated as "God has healed". In Tobit he goes by the name Azariah (Hebrew: עֲזַרְיָה/עֲזַרְיָהוּ ʿĂzaryāh/ʿĂzaryāhū, "Yah/Yahu has helped") while disguising himself as a human. In the text he acts as a physician and expels demons, using an extraordinary fish to bind the demon Asmodeus and to heal Tobit's eyes, while in 1 Enoch he is "set over all disease and every wound of the children of the people", and binds the armies of Azazel and throws them into the valley of fire.

In post-biblical Judaism

According to the Babylonian Talmud, Raphael ( Rəfāʾēl, Tiberian: Răp̄āʾēl) was one of the three angels who appeared to Abraham in the oak grove of Mamre in the region of Hebron (Genesis 18; Bava Metzia 86b); Michael, as the greatest, walked in the middle, with Gabriel to his right and Raphael to his left (Yoma 37a). Each was commanded to carry out a specific mission, Gabriel to destroy Sodom, Michael to inform Sarah that she would give birth to Isaac, Raphael to heal Abraham from his recent circumcision and save Lot. Rashi writes, "Although Raphael's mission included two tasks, they were considered a single mission since they were both acts that saved people." The Life of Adam and Eve lists him with the archangels Michael, Gabriel, Uriel and Joel, and the medieval Jewish philosopher Maimonides included his name in his Jewish angelic hierarchy.

In Midrash Konen it is revealed that Raphael was originally once named Libbiel (Hebrew: לִבִּיאֵל Lībbīʾēl; Meaning: "God is my heart"). In the Midrash, God takes council with His Angels before he creates Adam the first Man. The Angels were not all of one opinion however, with differing views and reasons. The Angel of Love and Angel of Justice both favoured Man's creation as he would be affectionate and loving, alongside practicing Justice. The Angel of Truth and the Angel of Peace opposed his creation however, as he would be full of lies and be quarrelsome. To invalidate his protest, God cast the Angel of Truth down from Heaven to Earth, and when the others cried out against the treatment of their companion, He said, "Truth will spring back out of the earth." Before their objections, God had only told the Angels of the good there would be among Humans, but not of the evil too. Despite not knowing the whole truth, the Angels were nevertheless prompted to cry out: "What is man, that Thou art mindful of him? And the son of man, that Thou visitest him?" God replied: "The fowl of the air and the fish of the sea, what were they created for? Of what avail a larder full of appetizing dainties, and no guest to enjoy them?" And the Angels could not but exclaim: "O Lord, our Lord, how excellent is Thy name in all the earth! Do as is pleasing in Thy sight." For not a few of the Angels their opposition bore fatal consequences. When God summoned the band under the Archangel Michael, and asked their opinion on the creation of man, they answered scornfully: "What is man, that Thou art mindful of him? And the son of man, that Thou visitest him?" God thereupon stretched forth His little finger, and all were consumed by fire except their Chief Michael. And the same fate befell the band under the leadership of the Archangel Gabriel; he alone of all was saved from destruction. The third band consulted was commanded by the Archangel Libbiel. Taught by the horrible fate of his predecessors, he warned his troop: "You have seen what misfortune overtook the Angels who said 'What is man, that Thou art mindful of him?' Let us have a care not to do likewise, lest we suffer the same dire punishment. For God will not refrain from doing in the end what He has planned. Therefore it is advisable for us to yield to His wishes." Thus warned, the Angels spoke: "Lord of the world, it is well that Thou hast thought of creating man. Do Thou create him according to Thy will. And as for us, we will be his attendants and his ministers, and reveal unto him all our secrets." Thereupon God changed the Archangel Libbiel's name to Raphael, the Rescuer, because his Host of Angels had been rescued by his sage advice. He was appointed the Angelic Prince of Healing, who has in his safe-keeping all the celestial remedies, the types of the medical remedies used on Earth.

In the Midrash Tanhuma, Satan becomes envious of the righteous R. Matthew bar Heresh after seeing him sitting occupied in Torah study, without looking at anyone's wife or any other woman. Believing it to be impossible for a righteous man to exist in the world without sin, Satan asks God how He views Rabbi Matthew; He sees him as completely righteous. Satan then asks for permission to test R. Matthew, which is granted to him. Satan then takes the form of a beautiful woman upon finding the Rabbi studying Torah. After seeing that Satan would continue to try and tempt him from all sides; he used hot pins to blind himself lest his evil inclination prevail. Satan then trembled in dismay and reported back to God. Immediately upon hearing this, God called Raphael, Prince of the Healing Arts, commanding him to heal the eyes of R. Matthew bar Heresh. When Raphael goes to R. Matthew and reveals his identity and mission, the Rabbi states that he does not wish to be healed. Raphael then returns to God informing Him of this. Upon hearing this God commands Raphael to tell the Rabbi not to fear, for his evil inclination will not prevail. When he heard this from the mouth of the angel, he accepted his healing and was not afraid.

In Rabbeinu Bahya, a commentary on the Torah written by Rabbi Bahya ben Asher (1255–1340), the Camp of Ephraim, situated to the west of the Tabernacle (Numbers 2:18), corresponded to the celestial camp headed by the archangel Raphael supported by the angels Zavdiel and Achziel. It is also said that this was the camp that Moses alluded to when he prayed that Miriam be healed from her tzaraath by saying "please God heal her" (Numbers 12:13). He appealed to the attribute represented by Raphael.

It is said in Kav HaYashar by Rabbi Tzvi Hirsch Kaidanover (1648–1712), that when the angels appointed to bring infirmity and sickness upon people behold the angel Raphael, they take fright and flee. Then Raphael extends healing to the invalid.

In the Beginning of Wisdom, an introduction to kabbalistic thought composed by Rabbi Aharon Meir Altshuler (1835–1905) in Warsaw between 1887–1893; Raphael is said to correspond to the Sephirah of Tiphereth (Beauty). He is said to act as an intermediate conduct between Chesed (Kindness) corresponding to Michael, and Din (Judgement) corresponding to Gabriel. Uriel (alternatively named Nuriel) is also said to act as an intermediate conduct alongside Raphael. It is further explained that when he inclines toward Chesed he is called Uriel, but when he inclines toward Din he is called Nuriel. In the same context, the Sefer HaBahir calls Raphael the "Prince of Peace" (Hebrew: שַׂר־שָׁלוֹם Śar Šālōm). The text states that his reconciliation between Michael, the prince to God's right, and Gabriel, the prince to God's left is the meaning of the verse, "He imposes peace in His heights" (Job 25:2). With Raphael being the Archangel of Air that establishes peace between Fire and Water.

In kabbalistic astrology, Raphael is most commonly associated with the Sun (alongside Michael) and the planet Mercury. The Zohar also associates him with the image of man in the tetramorph of the four holy living creatures of the Prophet Ezekiel's vision, alongside the zodiac sign of Aquarius, and in relation to the image of man; the Sephirah of Malkhuth (Kingdom) and the Earth. As well as Tiphereth and Malkhuth, the Zohar also has Raphael corresponding to the Sephirah of Hod (Majesty), the Euphrates river (Hebrew: פְרָת Pərāt, Tiberian: Părāṯ; the fourth river of Eden in Genesis) the left leg of the body, and the Israelite Tribe of Ephraim. The text states: "The fourth (river) is Hod (Majesty), the "left leg" (referred to in what was said of Jacob, that "he halted on his left thigh"), and from it shall drink the camp of Raphael, whose mission is to heal the ills of the captivity, and with it the tribe of Ephraim and his two accompanying tribes (Manasseh and Benjamin)."

It is also customary in Judaism to invoke Raphael as one of the Four Archangels after one recites the Shema before going to bed; with Michael by your right side, Gabriel by your left side, Uriel before you, and Raphael behind you. This practice is also referred to in Rebbe Nachman of Breslov's (1772–1810) Likutei Etzot. In this work, he refers to the invocation of the Four Archangels as “binding the chariot”.

Christianity

The New Testament names only two archangels or angels, Michael and Gabriel (Luke 1:9–26; Jude 1:9; Revelation 12:7), but Raphael, because of his association with healing, became identified with the unnamed angel of John 5:1–4 who periodically stirred the pool of Bethesda "[a]nd he that went down first into the pond after the motion of the water was made whole of whatsoever infirmity he lay under". The Catholic Church accordingly links Raphael with Michael and Gabriel as saints whose intercession can be sought through prayer.

Patronage

Due to his actions in the Book of Tobit and the Gospel of John, Saint Raphael is considered patron of travelers, the blind, happy meetings, nurses, physicians, medical workers, matchmakers, Christian marriage, and Catholic studies. As a particular enemy of the devil, he was revered in Catholic Europe as a special protector of sailors: on a corner of the famous Doge's Palace in Venice is a relief depicting Raphael holding a scroll on which is written: "Efficia fretum quietum" (“Keep the Gulf quiet”). On July 8, 1497, when Vasco da Gama set sail from Lisbon with his four-ship fleet to India, the flagship was named São Rafael at the insistence of King Manuel I of Portugal. When the flotilla reached the Cape of Good Hope on October 22, the sailors debarked and erected a column in the archangel's honor. The little statue of Raphael that accompanied Da Gama on the voyage is now in the Naval Museum in Lisbon.

Iconography
Raphael is said to guard pilgrims on their journeys, and is often depicted holding a staff. He is also often depicted holding or standing on a fish, which alludes to his healing of Tobit with the fish's gall. Early mosaics often show him and the other archangels in the clothing of a Byzantine courtier.

Feast day
The feast day of Raphael was included for the first time in the General Roman Calendar in 1921, for celebration on October 24. With the 1969 revision of the General Roman Calendar, the feast was transferred to September 29 for celebration together with archangels Saints Michael and Gabriel. Due to Pope Benedict XVI's Summorum Pontificum, the Catholic Church permits, within certain limits for public use, the General Roman Calendar of 1960, which has October 24 as Raphael's feast day.

The Coptic Orthodox Church celebrates his feast on Kouji Nabot 3 and Koiak 13.

Archangel Raphael is commemorated by Eastern Orthodox Church on 8 November in the Synaxis of the Archangel Michael and the Other Bodiless Powers.

In the Antiochian Western Rite Vicariate Saint Raphael the Archangel is commemorated on 24 October.

He is commemorated in some Spanish dioceses on the old date – 24 October and on 7 May (apparition)

In Diocese of Warszawa-Praga he is commemorated on 3 October (with Michael and Gabriel), the feast was transferred from September 29 (Dedication day of cathedral church)

In Oriental Orthodox Church dedication of church of Saint Raphael on the back of a whale is commemorated on 26 August (3 Pagumen).

Apparitions
The Archangel Raphael is said to have appeared in Cordoba, Spain, during the 16th century; in response to the city's appeal, Pope Innocent X allowed the local celebration of a feast in the Archangel's honor on May 7, the date of the principal apparition. Saint John of God, founder of the Hospital order that bears his name, is also said to have received visitations from Saint Raphael, who encouraged and instructed him. In tribute to this, many of the Brothers Hospitallers of St. John of God's facilities are called “Raphael Centers” to this day. The 18th century Neapolitan nun, Saint Maria Francesca of the Five Wounds is also said to have seen apparitions of Raphael.

In Islam

Raphael (alternate spellings: Israfel, Esrafil) is a venerated archangel according to Islamic tradition. In Islamic eschatology, Israfil will blow the trumpet from a holy rock in Jerusalem to announce the Day of Judgment (Yawm al-Qiyāmah). The trumpet is constantly poised at his lips, ready to be blown when God so orders.

The name "Israfil" (or "Israfel", "Esrafil") is not specifically written in the Quran, although there is mention of an unnamed trumpet-angel assumed to identify this figure:

Certain Islamic sources indicate that, created at the beginning of time, Israfil possesses four wings, and is so tall as to be able to reach from the earth to the pillars of heaven. A beautiful angel who is a master of music, Israfil sings praises to God in a thousand different languages, the breath of which is used to inject life into hosts of angels who add to the songs themselves. Further he is probably the highest angel, since he also mediates between God and the other archangels, reading on the Preserved Tablet (al-lawh al-mahfooz) to transmit the commands of God. Although disputed, some reports assert, he visited Muhammad prior to the archangel Gabriel.

According to Sufi traditions reported by Imam Rafa'il, the Ghawth or Qutb ('perfect human being'), is someone who has a heart that resembles that of the archangel Israfil, signifying the loftiness of this angel. The next in rank are the saints who are known as the Umdah or Awtad, amongst whom the highest ones have their hearts resembling that of archangel Mikhail (archangel Michael), and the rest of the lower ranking saints having the heart of Jibrail (archangel Gabriel), and that of the previous prophets before the Islamic prophet Muhammad. The earth is believed to always have one of the Qutb.

In another account, Rafāʾīl (Arabic: رفائيل) is mentioned by name in the Islamic tradition narrated by Ath-Tha'labi from Ali. He is said to have met Dhu al-Qarnayn who is mentioned in the last part of Surah 18 of the Quran, al-Kahf ("The Cave"). Dhu al-Qarnayn (The Two Horned One) is believed by some to be Alexander The Great. 

The angel told Dhu al-Qarnayn about the Water of Life (Ayn al-Hayat). Hearing that there was such a spring, Dhu al-Qarnayn wanted to drink the Water of Life, but the only one who had succeeded in drinking it was his cousin, Khidr. In Islamic tradition, Khidr is the mystical guide popularly quoted especially in Sufi traditions who has attained a long life and appears to selected Islamic saints throughout the times.

Places named for Raphael
The following places have been named in honor of Raphael:

Saint Raphaël, France; Saint Raphaël, Quebec, Canada; and San Rafaels in Argentina, Bolivia, Colombia, Costa Rica, Chile, Mexico, Trinidad and Tobago, Peru, and the Philippines; also San Rafael de El Moján and San Rafael de Orituco in Venezuela.

 In the United States, San Rafaels inherited from Spain survive in California (where besides the city there are the San Rafael Mountains)
 New Mexico, and Utah, where the San Rafael River flows seasonally in the San Rafael Desert. 
 St. Raphael's Cathedral, the seat of the Diocese of Madison, Wisconsin
 St. Raphael's Cathedral, the seat of the Archdiocese of Dubuque
 Mission San Rafael Arcángel in San Rafael, California.
 St. Raphael's Episcopal Church in Crossville, Tennessee, in the Episcopal Diocese of East Tennessee.
 St. Raphael's Church, Huccaby, Hexworthy, Dartmoor National Park, Devon, England
 San Rafael, Vecindario, Santa Lucia de Tirajana Gran Canaria
 St. Raphael’s Catholic Church, Yeading, Hayes, Middlesex, England
 St. Raphael the Archangel Catholic Church and School, Raleigh, North Carolina
 St. Raphael the Archangel Parish, Saint Louis, Missouri

The Arcangelo Raffaello youth confraternity functioned in Florence, Italy from its founding in 1411 to its suppression in 1785.

St. John of God Catholic Church in Chicago, IL, was disassembled, moved and reassembled as St. Raphael the Archangel Church in Mill Creek, IL.

In popular culture
Raphael, along with many other prominent angels, appears in John Milton's Paradise Lost, in which he is assigned by God to re-warn Adam concerning the sin of eating of the tree of the knowledge of good and evil. He also expounds to Adam the War in Heaven in which Lucifer and the demons fell, and the creation of the Earth.

In Joseph Haydn's Creation, Raphael (bass) is one of the three angelic narrators, along with Gabriel (soprano) and Uriel (tenor).

Characters associated with Angelic figures, at least by borrowing the names, also feature in the video game industry, as an example there is the title: El Shaddai: Ascension of the Metatron.

Raphael features as one of the four archangels in the TV series Supernatural.

In season 2 of the TV series Criminal Minds the archangel Raphael is brought up as being one of Tobias Hankel's personalities.

In the Yogscast YouTube series Shadow of Israphel, the main antagonist and titular character derives his namesake from that of St. Raphael.

Gallery

See also
 List of angels in theology
 Angels in Judaism
 Feast of Saint Raphael, Ollur
 Saint Raphael, patron saint archive

Notes

References

Bibliography

 
 
 
 
 
 
 
 
 
 
 
 

 

Archangels
Archangels in Christianity
Archangel in Judaism
Archangels in Islam
Christian saints from the Old Testament
Individual angels
Book of Tobit
Theophoric names
Angels in the Book of Enoch
Eastern Orthodox saints
Western Rite Orthodoxy
Supernatural healing